Brand-Nagelberg is a town in the district of Gmünd in the Austrian state of Lower Austria.

Geography
Brand-Nagelberg lies in the Waldviertel in Lower Austria. About 68.22 percent of the municipality is forested.

References

External links
Municipal website

Cities and towns in Gmünd District